The Women's 100 metre butterfly event at the 2010 Commonwealth Games took place on 6 and 7 October 2010, at the SPM Swimming Pool Complex.

Four heats were held, with most containing the maximum number of swimmers (eight). The top sixteen times qualified for the semi-finals and, the top eight from there qualified for the finals.

Heats

Heat 1

Heat 2

Heat 3

Heat 4

Semifinals

Semifinal 1

Semifinal 2

Final

References

Aquatics at the 2010 Commonwealth Games
Women's 100 metre butterfly
2010 in women's swimming